Nicholas Alwyn (13 June 1938 – 16 June 2021) was an English first-class cricketer who played for  Cambridge University Cricket Club.  His highest score of 41 came when playing for Cambridge University in the match against Essex County Cricket Club. He was the son of the composer William Alwyn.

References

English cricketers
Cambridge University cricketers
Living people
1938 births
People from Finchley